MW or mW may refer to:

Science and technology
MediaWiki, (MW) the software that runs MediaWiki-powered websites
Megawatt, (MW) a unit of power
Milliwatt, (mW) one thousandth of a watt
.mw, the country code top level domain (ccTLD) for Malawi
Medium wave, (MW) frequency range of 530 to 1700 kHz (commonly called the AM band)
Molecular weight, a former term for molecular mass
Microwave, a type of electromagnetic wave
Moment magnitude scale, a measure of earthquake size
Weight average molecular weight

Arts and entertainment

Games
Call of Duty 4: Modern Warfare, a 2007 first person shooter
Call of Duty: Modern Warfare, a 2019 first person shooter
MechWarrior, a video game series first released in 1989
Need for Speed: Most Wanted (disambiguation), two racing video games released in 2005 and 2012

Other media
MW (manga), a manga series by Osamu Tezuka
Miss World, an international beauty pageant
Museums and the Web, an international conference series
MW (film), a 2009 Japanese film
Mythic Warriors, a cartoon series

Companies
Men's Wearhouse, a men's dress apparel retailer
Merriam-Webster, an American publisher of dictionaries etc.
Mountain West Conference, an American collegiate sports conference
Mokulele Airlines (IATA airline designator MW)

Places
Malawi (ISO 3166-1 country code)
Midwestern United States region
Manhattan West, New York, NY, USA

Other uses
Master of Wine, a wine expertise qualification

See also
MWI (disambiguation)
MW-1, a German munitions dispenser
MWA (disambiguation)